Balboni is an Italian surname. Notable people with the surname include:

June Mathis Balboni (1887–1927), American screenwriter
Michael A.L. Balboni, member of the New York State Senate
Steve Balboni, former Major League Baseball player
Valentino Balboni, former chief test driver of Lamborghini

Italian-language surnames